The Comet was a British comic magazine, launched by Cheshire-based publisher J. B. Allen on 20 September 1946. When the publisher was taken over by the Amalgamated Press in May 1949, Leonard Matthews was appointed editor and exchanged the paper's customary humour strips for adventure ones like Battler Britton, Billy the Kid, Robin Hood, Kit Carson, Dick Turpin and Jet-Ace Logan. It continued publishing until 17 October 1959, when it was merged into Tiger.

References

External links
 
 
Greyfriars Index - Publications of the Month includes a downloadable pdf of issue 428 of the original series (1953)

Comics magazines published in the United Kingdom
1946 comics debuts
1959 comics endings
Magazines established in 1946
Magazines disestablished in 1959
Defunct British comics